Vice Admiral Surinder Pal Singh Cheema PVSM, AVSM, NM is a former Flag Officer in the Indian Navy. He last served as Flag Officer Commanding-in-Chief of the Western and Southern Naval Commands. He also served as the Commander-in-Chief of Strategic Forces Command and the Chief of Integrated Defence Staff to the Chairman of the Chiefs of Staff Committee. He retired from the service on 31 January 2016, after almost four decades of service.

Early life and education 
Cheema attended the Sainik School, Kunjpura. He then graduated from the National Defence Academy, Khadakwasla and was commissioned into the Indian Navy on 1 January 1977.

Military career 

Cheema is a missile and gunnery specialist. He was the Commissioning Commanding Officer of the Missile boat  and commanded the  missile corvette  and the  stealth frigate . He served as the 14th Commanding Officer of the  aircraft carrier . He also headed the naval base INS Mandovi.

He attended the Defence Services Staff College (DSSC), Wellington  where he was awarded the Lentaigne and Scudder Medals (for best dissertation and being "first in overall order of merit"). He also attended the College of Naval Warfare (CNW), Mumbai.

Flag Rank
As a Rear Admiral, Cheema commanded the Western Fleet from 2008 to 2009.
In his staff appointments, he served as the Controller Personnel Services at the Integrated Headquarters. He served as the Deputy Chief of Integrated Defence Staff (DCIDS) for Perspective Planning and Force Development (PP&FD) and for DOT in two different assignments. Apart from these, he served as the Chief of the Staff of Western Naval Command.

After promotion to the rank of Vice Admiral, he served in four different appointments as a Commander-in-Chief since being promoted to C-in-C grade on 31 August 2012. He served as the FOC-in-C of Southern Naval Command from 2014 to 2015; Commander-in-Chief of the Strategic Forces Command; Chief Of Integrated Defence Staff to the Chairman of the Chiefs of Staff Committee; and as lastly as the FOC-in-C of Western Naval Command. He also served as the Commandant of Indian Naval Academy. He retired on 31 January 2016, after four decades of service; Vice Admiral Sunil Lanba succeeded him as FOC-in-C of Western Naval Command.

Awards and decorations

Gallery

References

Indian Navy admirals
Flag Officers Commanding Western Fleet
Living people
Place of birth missing (living people)
Year of birth missing (living people)
Recipients of the Param Vishisht Seva Medal
Commandants of the Indian Naval Academy
Recipients of the Ati Vishisht Seva Medal
Recipients of the Nau Sena Medal
Defence Services Staff College alumni
Naval War College, Goa alumni